Jason Layman (born July 29, 1973) is a former American football offensive lineman in the National Football League. He was drafted by the Houston Oilers in the second round of the 1996 NFL Draft. He played college football at Tennessee. Layman started 39 consecutive games for the Tennessee Vols between 1992–1995. He was named team captain his senior year in 1995. Layman played with two top five draft picks at Quarterback in Heath Shuler and Peyton Manning. In 1999, the Titans made it to Super Bowl XXXIV in which Layman appeared as a substitute. However, they lost to the Kurt Warner-led St. Louis Rams.

References

1973 births
Living people
American football offensive tackles
American football offensive guards
Tennessee Volunteers football players
Houston Oilers players
Tennessee Oilers players
Tennessee Titans players
People from Sevierville, Tennessee